Wraprascal or "wrap-rascal" was an 18th-century term for a loose overcoat. It was long and loose and was worn by both men and women. The garment was fastened with huge metal buttons and was occasionally cape-style. The coat was used for riding.
Frederick William Fairholt compares it to the following version of surtout in his work Costume in England.

References 

 

Coats (clothing)